Tadhg Óg Murphy (born 6 January 1986 in Glanmire, County Cork) is an Irish hurler who played as a right corner-forward for the Cork senior team.

Born in Glanmire, County Cork, Murphy first arrived on the inter-county scene at the age of twenty-three when he first linked up with the Cork senior team. He made his senior debut during the 2009 National Hurling League. Throughout his career, Murphy made just two championship appearances for Cork. He retired from inter-county hurling after the conclusion of the 2010 championship.

At club level, Murphy won four championship medals with Sarsfields.

His grandfather, Bertie, his father, Tadhg, and his uncle, Bertie Óg, all lined out at various levels with cork in both hurling and Gaelic football.

Honours

Team

Sarsfield's
Cork Senior Hurling Championship (1): 2008, 2010, 2012, 2014 (c)

References

1986 births
Living people
Sarsfields (Cork) hurlers
Cork inter-county hurlers
Irish schoolteachers